The Kingston Peninsula is a peninsula in southern New Brunswick, Canada, located between the Saint John River and the Kennebecasis River in Kings County.

The peninsula was the site of the first United Empire Loyalist settlement in New Brunswick in 1783.

The 2001 Census reports a population of 3,477 on the Kingston Peninsula, consisting of Kingston Parish and the section of Westfield Parish east of the Saint John River.

Communities on the Kingston Peninsula include:
Bayswater
Carters Point
Clifton Royal
Hardings Point
Holderville
Kingston
Long Reach
Reeds Point
Shampers Bluff
Summerville
Chapel Grove
Whitehead
Gorham's Bluff
Pipertown Road

Three ferries connect the peninsula to Grand Bay-Westfield, Saint John and Quispamsis (the latter of which was the site of the world's first cable ferry).

Route 845, which runs along the perimeter of the peninsula, is the main local road. There is also a seasonal provincial ferry (May–November) from Summerville to Kennebecasis Island, a small summer community in Milkish Channel.

External links
Kingston Peninsula Chamber of Commerce
 Friends of Kingston Peninsula say No to Kingston Cliffs Subdivision

Peninsulas of New Brunswick
Landforms of Kings County, New Brunswick